Algimonas arctica is a Gram-negative and aerobic bacterium from the genus of Algimonas which has been isolated from sand from the Arctic.

References 

Caulobacterales
Bacteria described in 2015